Music Hall Parade is a 1939 British musical film directed by Oswald Mitchell. The film featured Glen Raynham,  Richard Norris (actor), and Charles Sewell. Sid Palmer also had a role. The story is about a daughter who works to keep her father's music hall going after his death. The film was reissued in 1940 as Cavalcade of Variety. The film was produced at the Walton on Thames studios. Renown Pictures released a digitally remastered edition of the film in 2011.

Billy Cotton and his Band perform in the film.

Critical reception
TV Guide called it above average with a thin plot but fun acts. Monthly Film Bulletin gave a similar assessment, praising the variety acts and noting the slim plot.

References

External links

1939 films
British musical films
1939 musical films
British black-and-white films
Films scored by Percival Mackey
Films directed by Oswald Mitchell
1930s British films